Abdur Razzaque Ansari was an Indian nationalist, freedom fighter, and a leader of the weavers revolution.

Tributes
The Abdur Razzaque Ansari Memorial Hospital was established in his honor by Chotanagpur Regional Handloom Weavers Co-operative Union Ltd and the members of his family in Ranchi in 1996.

On 10 September 2009, Vice-President of India Hamid Ansari inaugurated the Abdur Razzaque Ansari Cancer Institute.

References

Indian independence activists from Jharkhand
Indian Muslims
Year of birth missing
People from Ranchi
Indian weavers